The name Al-Isfahani is a nisba indicating someone from the city of Isfahan, Iran.

People with this name include:
 Hamza al-Isfahani (d. 961), Persian historian
 Abu al-Faraj al-Isfahani (d. 967), Arab historian and author of Kitāb al-Aghānī
 Abu Bakr al-Isfahani (d. 908), Persian scholar in Warsh recitation
 Abu Nu'aym al-Isfahani (d. 1038), shafi'i hadith scholar who wrote the most important source for the early development of Sufism
 Abu-l-Fath Mahmud ibn Mohammed ibn Qasim ibn Fadl al-Isfahani, a 10th-century Persian mathematician
 Al-Raghib al-Isfahani (d.1108/1109), an Islamic scholar
 Ghiyath al-Din 'Ali ibn Amirin al-Husayni al-Isfahani, a 15th-century Persian physician and scientist from Isfahan
 Imad ad-Din al-Isfahani, a 12th-century historian
 Jalal al-Din Muhammad al-Isfahani, a 19th-century Persian physician from Isfahan

Nisbas